Maighréad Ní Dhomhnaill is the début music album by Irish musician Maighread Ní Dhomhnaill (formerly Maighréad Ní Dhomnaill). It was released in Ireland in 1976.

Track listing
"Éirigh Suas A Stóirín"
"Máire An Chúil Óir Bhuí"
"Fóill, Fóill A Shagairt"
"Lately Last Night"
"Here's a Health"
"Ar A Dhul Go Baile Átha Cliath Dhomh"
"Róisín Dubh"
"Amhrán Hiúdaí Phádaí Éamoinn"
"Barbara Allen"
"Séan Ó Duibhir An Ghleanna"

External links
 Gael Linn Record company

1976 debut albums
Maighread Ní Dhomhnaill albums